Source-available software is software released through a source code distribution model that includes arrangements where the source can be viewed, and in some cases modified, but without necessarily meeting the criteria to be called open-source. The licenses associated with the offerings range from allowing code to be viewed for reference to allowing code to be modified and redistributed for both commercial and non-commercial purposes.

Distinction from free and open-source software 
Any software is source-available software as long its source code is distributed along with it, even if the user has no legal rights to use, share, modify or even compile it. It is possible for a software to be both source-available software and proprietary software (For example: Id Software Doom). 

In contrast, the definitions of free software and open-source software are much narrower. Free software and/or open-source software is also always source-available software, but not all source-available software is also free software and/or open-source software. This is because the official definitions of those terms require considerable additional rights as to what the user can do with the available source (including, typically, the right to use said software, with attribution, in derived commercial products).

Free and open-source licenses 

Free software licenses and open-source software licenses are also source-available software licenses, as they both require the source code of the software to be made available.

Non-free licenses 
The following source-available software licenses are considered non-free licenses because they have limitations that prevent them from being open-source according to the Open Source Initiative and free to the Free Software Foundation.

Commons Clause 

The Commons Clause, created by Fossa, Inc., is an addendum to an open-source software license that restricts users from selling the software. Under the combined license, the software is source-available, but not open-source.

On August 22, 2018, Redis Labs shifted some Redis Modules from the Affero General Public License to a combination of the Apache License 2.0 and the Commons Clause.

In September 2018, Matthew Garrett criticized Commons Clause calling it an "older way of doing things" and said it "doesn't help the commons".

GitLab Enterprise Edition License (EE License) 

The GitLab Enterprise Edition License is used exclusively by GitLab's commercial offering. GitLab also releases a Community Edition under the MIT License.

GitLab Inc. openly discloses that the EE License makes their Enterprise Edition product "proprietary, closed source code." However, the company makes the source code of the Community Edition public, as well as the repository's issue tracker, and allows users to modify the source code. The dual release of the closed-source Enterprise Edition and the open-source Community Edition makes GitLab an open core company.

Mega Limited Code Review Licence 

In 2016, Mega Ltd. released the source code of their Mega clients under the Mega Limited Code Review Licence, which only permits usage of the code "for the purposes of review and commentary". The source code was released after former director Kim Dotcom stated that he would "create a Mega competitor that is completely open source and non-profit" following his departure from Mega Ltd.

Microsoft Shared Source Initiative 

Microsoft's Shared Source Initiative, launched in May 2001, comprises 5 licenses, 2 of which are open-source and 3 of which are restricted. The restricted licenses under this scheme are the Microsoft Limited Public License (Ms-LPL), the Microsoft Limited Reciprocal License (Ms-LRL), and the Microsoft Reference Source License (Ms-RSL).

Old Scilab License 

Prior to version 5, Scilab described itself as "the open source platform for numerical computation" but had a license that forbade commercial redistribution of modified versions. Versions 5 and later are distributed under the GPL-compatible CeCILL license.

Server Side Public License 

The Server Side Public License is a modification of the GNU General Public License version 3 created by the MongoDB project. It adds a clause stating that if SSPL-licensed software is incorporated into a "service" offered to other users, the source code for the entirety of the service must be released under the SSPL. The license has been considered non-free by Debian and Red Hat (with software licensed under it therefore banned from their Linux distributions), as well as the Open Source Initiative, as it contains conditions that are unduly discriminatory towards commercial use of the software.

SugarCRM Public License 

In 2007 Michael Tiemann, president of OSI, had criticized companies such as SugarCRM for promoting their software as "open source" when in fact it did not have an OSI-approved license. In SugarCRM's case, it was because the software is so-called "badgeware" since it specified a "badge" that must be displayed in the user interface. SugarCRM's open source version was re-licensed under the GPL version 3 in 2007, and later the GNU Affero GPL version 3 in 2010.

TrueCrypt License 

The TrueCrypt License was used by the TrueCrypt disk encryption utility. When TrueCrypt was discontinued, the VeraCrypt fork switched to the Apache License, but retained the TrueCrypt License for code inherited from TrueCrypt.

The Open Source Initiative rejects the TrueCrypt License, as "it has elements incompatible with the OSD." The Free Software Foundation criticizes the license for restricting who can execute the program, and for enforcing a trademark condition.

BeeGFS End User License Agreement 
BeeGFS EULA is the license of the distributed parallel file system BeeGFS, except the client for Linux, which is licensed under GPLv2.

BeeGFS source code is publicly available from their website, and because of this they claiming BeeGFS as "Open-Source" software; it is in fact not because this license prohibits distributing modified versions of the software, or using certain features of the software without authorization.

See also

 Comparison of free and open-source software licenses
 Free software
 Free software license
 List of commercial video games with available source code
 List of proprietary source-available software
 List of source-available video games
 Open-core model
 Open-source license
 Open-source software
 Shared Source Initiative

References

Software licenses